Ivan Babaryka (born 11 November 1982) is a Ukrainian long distance runner who specialises in the marathon.

Career
He began his career as a track athlete and became the Ukrainian indoor champion over 3000 metres in 2006. He won the 2007 Moscow International Peace Marathon, running a time of 2:20:34 in severe weather conditions. He finished in second place with a time of 2:14:55 at the 2008 Mainz Marathon, behind compatriot Andriy Naumov. He returned to Moscow in September and defended his marathon title with a time of 2:20:11. The following year, he was again runner up at the Mainz Marathon, this time to Sammy Kipkoech Tum, recording a season's best time of 2:15:36. He finished fifth at the Albstädter Citylauf with a time of 30:06, but he was the fastest European runner outside of the all-Kenyan top four.

He started 2010 with a win in the Championship of Ukraine of the Ministry of Internal Affairs 5K cross country race. He was a surprise winner of the Pyongyang Marathon in April that year, knocking nearly a minute of his previous marathon best with 2:13:56 to take victory over more favoured opposition.

Road race wins
Moscow International Peace Marathon: 2007, 2008
Pyongyang Marathon: 2010

Personal bests

All information taken from IAAF profile.

References

External links

marathoninfo



1982 births
Living people
People from Novomoskovsk
Ukrainian male long-distance runners
Ukrainian male marathon runners
Olympic athletes of Ukraine
Athletes (track and field) at the 2012 Summer Olympics
World Athletics Championships athletes for Ukraine
Sportspeople from Dnipropetrovsk Oblast
21st-century Ukrainian people